Sidney H. Griffith (born 1938) is a professor of Early Christian Studies at the Catholic University of America. His main areas of interest are Arabic Christianity, Syriac monasticism, medieval Christian-Muslim encounters and ecumenical and interfaith dialogue.

Career
Griffith began his career when he was ordained a Catholic priest in 1965. He continued his studies and was awarded a licentiate in theology in 1967 from the Catholic University of America. In 1977, he graduated with a Ph.D. from the same university. The subject of the thesis was Syriac and Medieval Arabic. He immediately assumed teaching duties, and in 1984 rose to director of the university's Graduate Program in Early Christian Studies. During his career, he has been a visiting professor or fellow at, among other institutions, The Institute for Advanced Studies at The Hebrew University of Jerusalem and Georgetown University. Furthermore, he has been president of three separate professional societies in his field. He has published prolifically on Syriac Christianity and Christian Arabs.

His main areas of interest are Arabic Christianity, Syriac monasticism, medieval Christian-Muslim encounters and ecumenical and interfaith dialogue. He serves on the advisory board of the journal Collectanea Christiana Orientalia, and gives guest lectures at prestigious institutions.

Awards
In 2009, Griffith was awarded a Rumi Peace Award for his efforts in interfaith dialogue. The same year, his book The Church in the Shadow of the Mosque: Muslims and Christians in the World of Islam was awarded the Albert C. Outler Prize for the best book on ecumenical church history by the American Society of Church History. The book has been widely and approvingly reviewed.

Works

References

External links and further reading
 Bibliography at the Catholic University of America
 Griffith, Sidney H., The Bible in Arabic: The Scriptures of the 'People of the Book' in the Language of Islam 

1938 births
Living people
Catholic University of America faculty